Johann Geiszler (born 29 June 1926) was an Austrian rower. He competed in the men's coxless four event at the 1952 Summer Olympics.

References

External links
 

1926 births
Possibly living people
Austrian male rowers
Olympic rowers of Austria
Rowers at the 1952 Summer Olympics
Place of birth missing